= Tina Musuya =

Ugandan women's rights activist

- Born: Kampala, Uganda
- Occupation: Women's rights activist
- Employer: Social Development Direct
- Known for: Work on preventing violence against women

Tina Musuya is a Ugandan women's rights activist whose work focuses on preventing violence against women. She served as executive director of the Centre for Domestic Violence Prevention (CEDOVIP) from 2006 to 2021. Her work has included community-based programmes to prevent violence against women and advocacy for legislation addressing domestic violence in Uganda.

== Early life and education ==
Musuya was born and raised in Kampala, Uganda. She studied sociology at Makerere University, obtaining a Bachelor of Arts degree in 1995 and a Master of Arts degree in 2006.

== Career ==
Before joining CEDOVIP, Musuya worked in reproductive health programmes, including initiatives addressing HIV prevention among young people. She joined CEDOVIP in 2004 and became its executive director in 2006.

At CEDOVIP, Musuya worked with communities and local activists to address domestic violence and violence against women. She worked with Raising Voices on the piloting of SASA!, a community-led programme developed to address the social norms and power relations associated with violence against women. The programme was piloted in Kampala in 2007 and uses four phases: Start, Awareness, Support and Action.

Musuya also participated in advocacy for Uganda's Domestic Violence Act, which was passed in 2010. Her work included supporting efforts to draft and secure the passage of the legislation and advocating for its implementation.

In June 2018, Musuya received the gold award in the Human Rights category at the Women 4 Women Awards. At the time, she was executive director of CEDOVIP.

Musuya left CEDOVIP in 2021 after serving as its executive director for 15 years. She later joined Social Development Direct, where she works as Head of the Gender-Based Violence Portfolio. She has also served as a member of The Lancet Commission on Gender-based Violence and Maltreatment of Young People.
